Radinovići may refer to the following villages in central Bosnia:
 Radinovići, Visoko
 Radinovići, Zenica

See also
 Radanovići (disambiguation)